Gopal Bahadur Bam is a Nepalese Politician and serving as the Member Of House Of Representatives (Nepal) elected from Mugu-1, Province No. 6. He is member of the CPN (Unified Socialist).

References

Living people
Nepal MPs 2017–2022
Communist Party of Nepal (Unified Socialist) politicians
Nepal Communist Party (NCP) politicians
Nepal Workers Peasants Party politicians
Communist Party of Nepal (Unified Marxist–Leninist) politicians
1971 births